The city of Toledo, Ohio, the largest city and the county seat of Lucas County, Ohio, is the birthplace and home of several notable individuals. This is a list of people from Toledo, Ohio and includes people that were born or lived in Toledo, Ohio and the surrounding area. Individuals included in this listing are people presumed to be notable because they have received significant coverage in reliable sources that are independent of the subject.

Arts and entertainment

Architecture and design
Norman Bel Geddes – industrial designer, Hollywood set designer, noted modernist architect
Harold Van Doren – co-founder and former president of Society of Industrial Designers
 Lutah Maria Riggs – architect, known for her work in Santa Barbara, California

Art
Richard DeVore – ceramic artist
Sheree Hovsepian – Iranian-American collage artist and photographer, raised in Toledo.
Joseph Kosuth – conceptual artist
Paul Timman – Hollywood tattoo artist
Israel Abramofsky – modern artist

Journalism
 
Emily St. John Bouton – journalist, author, educator
Amy Braunschweiger – freelance journalist for The New York Times and The Wall Street Journal
Christine Brennan – USA Today sports columnist; ESPN, ABC, and NPR sports analyst; author of seven books
Janet Cooke – disgraced journalist, forced to return a Pulitzer Prize for a fabricated story
Steve Hartman – CBS News reporter
Louise Markscheffel – journalist, editor, critic
David Ross Locke – journalist and political commentator during American Civil War under pen name Petroleum V. Nasby
P. J. O'Rourke – political satirist, journalist, writer
Gloria Steinem – founder of Ms.; feminist icon; journalist; women's rights advocate

Literature and poetry
Mildred Benson – author of the original books in the Nancy Drew series
Michael Brooks – historian and journalist
Leah Marie Hemsley-Brown - bestselling novelist, journalist, photographer  
Paul Laurence Dunbar – poet, originally from Dayton, Ohio
Edward Eager – author of children's books
Louis Effler – medical writer and doctor
Mari Evans – author, dramatist
 Margaret Wynne Lawless (1847–1926) – poet, author, educator, philanthropist
Christopher Moore – novelist
Scott Nearing – conservationist, peace activist, educator, writer
Allen Saunders – cartoonist, creator of Mary Worth and Steve Roper comic strips
Scott Smith – novelist, author of A Simple Plan and The Ruins
Mildred D. Taylor – author of various novels concerning race relations, particularly Roll of Thunder, Hear My Cry and its sequels
Elizabeth Witherell – editor-in-chief of The Writings of Henry D. Thoreau

Modeling
Runa Lucienne – model, actress, social media influencer
Cynthia Myers – Playboy Playmate, model, actress
Jan Roberts – Playboy Playmate, model

Music

Rance Allen – gospel singer
Anita Baker – R&B singer, eight-time Grammy Award winner
Crystal Bowersox – singer-songwriter
Teresa Brewer – singer and actress
Chris Byrd – gospel singer
Stanley Cowell – pianist, composer
Citizen – rock band
Larry Fuller – jazz pianist
Jon Hendricks – member of the jazz group Lambert, Hendricks & Ross
Chester "Lyfe" Jennings – singer
Johnny and the Hurricanes – rock band
Koufax – alternative rock band
Lollipop Lust Kill – heavy metal/alternative band
Gary Louris – singer and guitarist for The Jayhawks
Shirley Murdock – R&B singer
Helen O'Connell – singer and TV personality
Frank Proffitt – banjoist
Jim Riggs – musician and music educator, University of North Texas Regents Professor Emeritus of Music
Sanctus Real – Christian rock band
Tom Scholz – founder of 1970s rock group Boston
Scott Shriner – bassist of the rock band Weezer
Ruby Starr – rock singer
Static Rituals – alternative rock band
Statik Link (member, Josh Andres) – electronic music producer
Stylex – electroclash/new wave band
Art Tatum – jazz pianist, recipient of Grammy Lifetime Achievement Award
This Beautiful Republic – Christian rock band
Cecile Vashaw, composer and music educator
We are the Fury – alternative rock band
Mary Zilba – singer

Theater and film

Dusty Anderson – actress and model
Cliff Arquette – actor, comedian, grandfather of David, Patricia, Alexis, and Rosanna Arquette
Jonathan Bennett – film actor
Casey Biggs – actor
William Blinn – screenwriter of Purple Rain (film), Roots (1977 miniseries), Fame (1982 TV series), Brian's Song and Eight Is Enough.
Pat Brady – actor, born Robert Ellsworth Patrick Aloysious
Joe E. Brown – actor, comedian
Daws Butler – voice actor, voice of Yogi Bear, Huckleberry Hound
Jason Cameron – actor, television presenter, model
John Cromwell – actor, film producer and director, father of James Cromwell
Jason Dohring – actor
Dominick Evans – filmmaker and activist
Jamie Farr – actor
Teresa Ganzel – actress
Philip Baker Hall – actor
Sandy Helberg – film and television actor
Katie Holmes – actress
Rich Iott – television and film producer
Eric Kripke – television writer, director, and producer
Otto Kruger – actor
Lenore Lonergan – actress
Phyllis Welch MacDonald – actress
Brent Miller – film and television producer
Shirley Mitchell – radio and television actress
Cassie Okenka – Broadway actress and former reality TV star
Adrianne Palicki – film and television actress
Kate Shindle – Broadway actress
Robert B. Sinclair – film and theater director
Alyson Stoner – actress and dancer
Lloyd Thaxton – producer, director, writer, hosted self-titled TV show in 1960s
Danny Thomas – actor, comedian, singer and father of Marlo Thomas
Bonnie Turner – creator of That '70s Show and 3rd Rock from the Sun
Derek Westerman – film director, screenwriter, and producer
Afton Williamson – television and film actress
Scott "Scott The Woz"  Wozniak - short film and content creator
Robert Drew – director and pioneer of cinéma-verité
Lizze Broadway – film and television actress

Government
Stephen Bolles – U.S. Representative from Wisconsin
Walter Folger Brown – former Postmaster General of the United States
Doug Ducey – Arizona Secretary of the Treasury, then Governor
Ernest E. Debs – Los Angeles City Council member and county supervisor, born in Toledo
Thomas Francis Ford – member of the U.S. Congress, elected to Los Angeles City Council by write-in vote
Samuel M. Jones – Mayor 1897-1904
Marcy Kaptur – U.S. Representative for Ohio's 9th congressional district
Kristina Keneally – Premier of New South Wales, Australia
Daniel Poneman - former U.S. Deputy Secretary of Energy
Stephanie Rader  – OSS spy in WWII
Jason Sheppard – member of the Michigan House of Representatives
Brand Whitlock – Mayor and U.S. Ambassador to Belgium during World War I

Business
Doug Dohring – former CEO and co-founder of Neopets
Martin Frankel – former financier convicted in 2002 of insurance fraud, racketeering and money laundering
Edward Drummond Libbey – glassmaker, philanthropist

Science and technology

Eugene F. "Gene" Kranz – retired NASA flight director who served during the Gemini and Apollo space programs, known for his role in the rescue of Apollo 13
Lyman Spitzer Jr. – theoretical physicist, astronomer, driving force behind the Hubble Space Telescope
Michael S. Witherell – particle physicist, former director of Fermilab, and presently director of Lawrence Berkeley National Laboratory

Sports

Baseball
A.J. Achter – (b. 1988) is a college baseball coach and former MLB baseball pitcher. 
Roger Bresnahan – (1879–1944), nicknamed "The Duke of Tralee" Baseball Hall of Fame member; who played for the New York Giants and also owned Toledo Mud Hens
Stan Clarke – (b. 1960) is a former pitcher in Major League Baseball.
Gene Cook – (1932–2002)longtime executive of Toledo Mud Hens, International League Hall of Fame member
Jack Hallett – (1914–1982) was a former Major League Baseball pitcher who played for Chicago White Sox, Pittsburgh Pirates, and New York Giants
Terry Harmon – (b. 1944) is a former professional baseball player who played for Philadelphia Phillies
Brad Hennessey – (b. 1980) is an American former professional baseball pitcher who played for San Francisco Giants
Addie Joss – (1880–1911), nicknamed "the Human Hairpin" was a Baseball Hall of Fame pitcher. He pitched for Cleveland Naps
Jim Joyce – (b. 1955) is a former professional baseball umpire.
Bill Laskey – (b. 1957) is a former professional baseball pitcher who played San Francisco Giants.
Jim Leyland – (b. 1944) is a former professional baseball player, coach and manager. He serves as a special assistant to the Detroit Tigers.
Zach McClellan – (b. 1978) is a former professional baseball pitcher who played for the Colorado Rockies.
Bob Meyer – (b. 1939) is a former Major League Baseball pitcher who played for New York Yankees, Milwaukee Brewers.
Doug Mientkiewicz – (b. 1974) is a retired professional baseball player, who most recently served as the manager for the Toledo Mud Hens. one of five American players to win both an Olympic gold medal and a World Series championship.
George Mullin - (1880–1944), known by the nickname "Wabash George", was a baseball pitcher for the Detroit Tigers
Lee Richmond – (1857–1929) was an American pitcher in Major League Baseball.  pitched first perfect game in MLB history.
Ron Rightnowar – (b. 1964) is a former major league baseball player who played for Milwaukee Brewers.

Basketball
John Amaechi – NBA player
Sonny Boswell - Inducted into the Naismith Basketball Hall of Fame, class of 2022
Don Collins – NBA player
William Buford - Ohio Mr. Basketball in 2008. Currently playing for Darüşşafaka Tekfen
Don Donoher – University of Dayton head coach
L. J. Cooke – first men's basketball head coach for Minnesota Golden Gophers
Duke Cumberland – Harlem Globetrotter
Don Donoher – head coach & athletic director for Dayton Flyers men's basketball; College Basketball Hall of Famer
Bob Harrison – NBA player
Nigel Hayes – player with Los Angeles Lakers
Dennis Hopson – NBA player
Melvin Newbern – NBA player
Natasha Howard – WNBA player
Jim Jackson – NBA player; olympic bronze medalist (1991 Pan American Games); analyst for Big Ten Network & Fox Sports 1 
Bill Jones – one of the first African-American players in NBL history
Howard "Butch" Komives – NBA player
Todd Mitchell – NBA player
Steve Mix – NBA player
Tony Peyton – last of the original Harlem Globetrotters; one of the first African-American players in NBL history
Walt Piatkowski – ABA player
Kelvin Ransey – NBA player
Brian Roberts – NBA & international basketball player
Paul Seymour – NBA player; All-Star Game head coach (1961)
Jae'Sean Tate – NBA player

Football

Tom Amstutz - head coach for University of Toledo Rockets
JoJuan Armour - NFL player (safety); CFL (linebacker)
Travis Baltz - NFL player (punter for Indianapolis Colts, New York Jets)
Myron Bell - NFL player (safety for Pittsburgh Steelers, Cincinnati Bengals)
Gerald (Jerry) Blanton - NFL player (linebacker for Kansas City Chiefs)
Sam Brandon - NFL player (safety for Denver Broncos)
Bob Briggs - AFL and NFL player (lineman for San Diego Chargers, Cleveland Browns, Kansas City Chiefs)
Khary Campbell - NFL player (linebacker for New York Jets, Washington Redskins); Bowling Green player
Jalil Carter - NFL player (cornerback for St. Louis Rams, Minnesota Vikings); CFL player (cornerback for Toronto Argonauts)
Bob Chappuis - AAFC quarterback; University of Michigan player; College Football Hall of Famer
Rob Chudzinski - NFL player and coach, former Cleveland Browns head coach
Don Coleman - NFL player for New Orleans Saints, New York Jets
Marvin Crenshaw - NFL player (offensive tackle for Pittsburgh Steelers
Frank Culver - NFL player for Buffalo All-Americans, Rochester Jeffersons, Canton Bulldogs
Fred Davis - NFL player (tight end for New England Patriots, Washington Redskins); USC player
Ray DiPierro - NFL player (guard for Green Bay Packers, New Orleans Saints)
Matt Eberflus - head coach of Chicago Bears
Brandon Fields - NFL player (punter for Miami Dolphins)
Todd France - NFL player (kicker for Philadelphia Eagles, Tampa Bay Buccaneers); University of Toledo player
Jon Giesler - NFL player (offensive tackle for Miami Dolphins)
Al Hadden - NFL player for Providence Steam Roller, Chicago Bears
Jim Harbaugh - NFL quarterback, head coach University of Michigan, Stanford, San Francisco 49ers
John Harbaugh - head coach of Baltimore Ravens
Willie Harper - NFL player (defensive end for San Francisco 49ers); two Super Bowls; first-team All-American for Nebraska
Stan Heath - NFL player (quarterback for Green Bay Packers); CFL player for Calgary Stampeders
Marty Huff - NFL player (linebacker for San Francisco 49ers); CFL player for Edmonton Eskimos; WFL player for Charlotte Hornets
Kareem Hunt - NFL player (running back for Kansas City Chiefs); University of Toledo player
Curtis Johnson - NFL player (defensive back for Miami Dolphins)
Dick Kazmaier - Princeton football player, 1951 Heisman Trophy winner
DeShone Kizer - NFL player (quarterback for Green Bay Packers, Cleveland Browns); Notre Dame player
Jerry Krall - NFL player (halfback/defensive back for Detroit Lions)
Roy Kurrasch - NFL player (end for Pittsburgh Steelers)
Jeremy Lincoln - NFL player (defensive back for New York Giants, Chicago Bears)
Mel Long - NFL player (defensive lineman for Cleveland Browns); first-team All-American for Toledo; College Football Hall of Famer
Ron McDole - NFL player (defensive end for Buffalo Bills, Washington Redskins)
Jack Mewhort - NFL player (offensive guard for Indianapolis Colts)
Urban Meyer - head coach of Jacksonville Jaguars, Ohio State, Bowling Green, Utah, Florida
Bob Momsen - NFL player (guard, linebacker for Detroit Lions, San Francisco 49ers)
Tony Momsen - NFL player (center, linebacker for Pittsburgh Steelers, Washington Redskins); CFL player for Calgary Stampeders
Roosevelt Nix - NFL player (defensive end for Cincinnati Bengals, Minnesota Vikings)
Storm Norton - NFL player (offensive tackle for Detroit Lions, Arizona Cardinals, Minnesota Vikings)
Bill Orwig - head coach for University of Toledo Rockets
Eric Page - NFL player (wide receiver/punt returner for Denver Broncos, Tampa Bay Buccaneers; University of Toledo player
Gerry Palmer - CFL player for Winnipeg Blue Bombers, BC Lions; University of Toledo player
Jim Parker - NFL player (offensive tackle for Baltimore Colts); College Football and Pro Football Hall of Famer
Shea Patterson - college football player (quarterback for University of Michigan)
Frank Pauly - NFL player (tackle for Chicago Bears)
Boni Petcoff - NFL player (tackle for Columbus Tigers); head coach for University of Toledo Rockets
Damond Powell - NFL football (wide receiver for Arizona Cardinals)
Bryan Robinson - NFL player (defensive tackle for Arizona Cardinals, Cincinnati Bengals, Miami Dolphins, Chicago Bears, St. Louis Rams)
Ryne Robinson - NFL player for Carolina Panthers, former Miami University player
James O. Rodgers - head coach for Yale
Jim Root (gridiron football) - NFL player (quarterback for Chicago Cardinals); head coach for New Hampshire, William & Mary
Dane Sanzenbacher - NFL player (wide receiver for Cincinnati Bengals), Ohio State player
Eddie Scharer - NFL player for Detroit Panthers, Pottsville Maroons, Detroit Wolverines
Warren Schmakel - head coach for Central Michigan, Boston University
Bob Snyder - NFL player for Chicago Bears; three-time NFL champion; head coach for Los Angeles Rams, Toledo Rockets
Bob Spitulski - NFL player (linebacker for Seattle Seahawks, St. Louis Rams)
Clint Stickdorn - NFL player (offensive tackle for Detroit Lions); University of Cincinnati player
Dick Strahm - College Football Hall of Famer; head coach for University of Findlay
Fred Sturt - NFL player for Washington Redskins, New England Patriots, New Orleans Saints; Bowling Green player
Dick Szymanski - NFL player (center/guard for Baltimore Colts; 3-time NFL champion & Pro-Bowl player
Chester Taylor - NFL player (running back for Minnesota Vikings); University of Toledo player
Joe Tiller - head coach for Purdue, Wyoming
Rick Upchurch - NFL player (wide receiver for Denver Broncos), 5-time All-Pro selection
Doc Urich - head coach for Buffalo, Northern Illinois
Eddie Usher - NFL player for Green Bay Packers
Dick Vick - NFL player for Kenosha Maroons, Detroit Panthers, Canton Bulldogs
Rick Volk - NFL player (safety for Baltimore Colts, New York Giants, Miami Dolphins; Super Bowl champion
Nate Washington - NFL player (wide receiver for Pittsburgh Steelers, Tennessee Titans); 2-time Super Bowl champion
Chuck Webb - NFL player (running back for Green Bay Packers)
Ivy Williamson - head coach for Wisconsin
Heath Wingate - NFL player (center for Washington Redskins; Bowling Green player
Chris Wormley - NFL player (defensive end for Baltimore Ravens, Pittsburgh Steelers)
Ernie Wright - NFL player (tackle for Los Angeles/San Diego Chargers, Cincinnati Bengals)

Ice hockey
Cecil Dillon – NHL player
Rick Hayward – NHL player
Pat Jablonski – NHL goaltender
Bryan Smolinski – NHL player

Golf
John Cook - PGA Tour golfer
Arthur Hills - golf course designer
Stacy Lewis - LPGA Tour golfer, winner of 2013 Women's British Open
Pat Lindsey - PGA Tour golfer; winner of 1983 B.C. Open
Byron Nelson - PGA Tour golfer; World Golf Hall of Fame member; former Inverness Club pro
Frank Stranahan - PGA Tour golfer; British Open and Masters runner-up; weightlifter
A. W. Tillinghast - golf course designer

Wrestling and boxing
Jared Anderson (boxer) professional boxer, heavyweight contender
Robert Easter Jr. – professional boxer, IBF lightweight world champion
Mark Kerr – Syracuse University Division I champion, US Senior Champion, professional mixed martial arts fighter
Wilbert McClure – gold medalist in boxing in 1960 Summer Olympics
Sawyer Fulton – professional  Wrestler, Former WWE Wrestler, Current IMPACT Wrestling Superstar 
Devin Vargas – professional boxer, former Olympian
Greg Wojciechowski – 1980 Olympic wrestler, unable to compete due to U.S. boycott; alternate in 1984 and 1988
Sonny Fredrickson – professional boxer
Trey Miguel – Current IMPACT Wrestling Superstar, current X Division Champion

Other sports
Gretchen Bleiler – silver medalist at 2006 Turin Olympics in snowboarding; three-time X Games champion (2003, 2005, 2008)
Paul Chamberlin – professional tennis player
Edmund Coffin – saddle maker, equestrian Olympic gold medalist
Terry Cook – driver in the NASCAR Camping World Truck Series
Iggy Katona – ARCA and NASCAR driver
Erik Kynard – silver medalist in men's high jump at 2012 London Olympics
Brenda Morehead – 100 meter sprinter, competed in 1976 Montreal Olympics. Graduate of Toledo Scott
Frances Schroth – swimmer, winner of one gold and two bronze medals in 1920 Olympic Games
Josie Fouts - Cyclist, Team USA. 2018 Paralympics Track Cycling National Championships, individual pursuit & time trial, gold

Other notables
Henry Noble MacCracken – longtime president of Vassar College, a founder of Sarah Lawrence College
Ernest M. McSorley – captain of the ill-fated lake freighter 
Selma Rubin – environmental activist based in Santa Barbara, California
Rosa L. Segur – suffragist
Ella P. Stewart – pharmacist (one of the first black female pharmacists in the United States), civic leader, and philanthropist

See also
List of mayors of Toledo, Ohio
List of people from Ohio

References

Toledo, Ohio
 
Toledo, Ohio